Penny Publications, LLC is a United States magazine publisher specializing in puzzles, mysteries, and crosswords. , Penny Publications publishes at least 85 magazines, distributed through newsstands, in stores, and by subscription in U.S. and Canada, and at least 60 puzzle books. Penny Publications' headquarters are in Norwalk, Connecticut.

History 
Penny Publications was founded in 1973 in Stamford, Connecticut, by the husband-and-wife team of William E. "Bill" Kanter and Penny Kanter. Bill Kanter was the son of Albert Kanter (1897–1973), founder of The Gilberton Company, formerly the publisher of Classics Illustrated. The Kanters combined the remaining Gilberton assets with a struggling crossword publisher to form Penny Press and Crosstown Publications. The parent company was named after Penny. In an homage to Classics Illustrated, one of the company's first titles was Classic Crosswords.

In March 1996, Penny Publications acquired Dell Magazines, founded in 1921 by George T. Delacorte, Jr. Dell Magazines, later popularly known for its science fiction and mystery magazines, had also early on published puzzle magazines, including crossword games, beginning in 1931 with Dell Crossword Puzzles. (Dell Crossword Puzzles, Official Crossword Puzzles, and Pocket Crossword Puzzles have been published continuously for more than 60 years.)

From 2001, by special arrangement with Three Across, Penny Publications has offered "New York Times style" crosswords to membership groups such as The Crosswords Club, The Large-Print Crosswords Club, and The Uptown Puzzle Club.

In early 2010, Penny Publications renewed its agreement with Comag Marketing Group LLC (CMG) for sale, marketing, and distribution of all of its titles, both under Penny Press and under Dell Magazine brands, in the U.S., Canada, and elsewhere.

Magazines and imprints published 
Magazines and imprints published by Penny Publications include:

 Alfred Hitchcock's Mystery Magazine
 Analog Science Fiction and Fact
 Asimov's Science Fiction Magazine
 Crossword
 Dell Collector's
 Dell Crossword Puzzles
 Dell's Best Easy Crosswords
 Ellery Queen's Mystery Magazine
 Family Favorites
 Family Variety Puzzles & Games
 Fill-In
 Logic and Math
 Official Crossword Puzzles
 Original Logic Problems
 Original Sudoku
 Penny Press Selected Series
 Penny's Finest Word Seeks
 Pocket Crossword Puzzles
 Sudoku
 Tournament Variety Puzzles
 Variety (not to be confused with Variety magazine)
 Will Shortz' WordPlay
 Word Seek
 Word Search

Notes

References

External links 
 
 

Magazine publishing companies of the United States
Publishing companies established in 1973
Monthly magazines published in the United States
Speculative fiction magazines published in the United States
Hugo Award-winning works